

Men's events

Medal table

1979
1979 Pan American Games